Issam Al Zaim (4 August 1940 – 14 December 2007) was a Syrian economist and former minister of industry. He also served as minister of state planning.

Career
Zaim was a researcher at the French National Centre for Scientific Research. Then Zaim held the post of minister of state for planning. He was appointed as minister of industry to the cabinet led by then prime minister Mohammad Mustafa Mero on 13 December 2001. His tenure ended in 2003 when the government resigned.

Controversy
Zaim and his wife's assets were seized by Syrian authorities in 2003 as part of a probe into the alleged misuse of public funds by the couple. He and his wife were acquitted of all charges a few months later.

Death
Zaim died of a heart attack at the age of 67 and was buried in Aleppo. He was survived by his wife and son.

References

1940 births
2007 deaths
20th-century Syrian economists
Syrian ministers of industry
Syrian ministers of state planning
People from Aleppo
Place of birth missing
Place of death missing
Arab Socialist Ba'ath Party – Syria Region politicians
21st-century Syrian economists